Abhishek Chaubey (born 30 March 1977) is an Indian director, screenwriter and film producer known for his works in Hindi cinema.

Early life 
Abhishek Chaubey was born in Ayodhya, Uttar Pradesh to Anand Mohan Chaubey and Sheela Chaubey. He spent his early childhood and adolescence in Jamshedpur, Patna and Ranchi. He completed his 10th standard from St. Xavier's School, Ranchi in the year 1993, completed 12th from Siva Sivani Public School, Hyderabad in the year 1995, and then did his graduation in English literature from Hindu College, New Delhi in the year 1998. Moving to Mumbai, he did a course in Film & Television Production from Xavier Institute of Communications before taking a headlong plunge in the world of Hindi films.

Career
He began his career as an associate director and co-writer to Vishal Bhardwaj for his debut  Makdee (2002). He went on to assist him in his subsequent films, and most notably co-wrote Vishal's trendsetting  Omkara (2006) and Kaminey (2009).

Abhishek's directorial debut, the dark comedy Ishqiya (2010) and its sequel Dedh Ishqiya (2014), both starring Naseeruddin Shah received rave reviews.

His following film, Udta Punjab (2016), highlighted the heroin epidemic in Punjab and was released to critical acclaim.

He made his debut as a producer with Konkona Sen Sharma's A Death in the Gunj  (2016), which premiered at MAMI Mumbai Film Festival. Currently, he is working on his next project.

His next directorial venture Sonchiriya (2019) presented a rooted tale set in Chambal and released to positive reviews from critics. It won Critics Award for Best Film at the 65th Filmfare Awards.

Filmography

Awards and nominations

References

External links
 

Hindi-language film directors
Indian male screenwriters
Hindu College, Delhi alumni
1977 births
Living people
21st-century Indian film directors
Film directors from Uttar Pradesh
People from Faizabad